The Kappa Delta Rho Fraternity House is a historic fraternity house located at the University of Illinois at Urbana–Champaign in Champaign, Illinois. The house was built in 1928 for the university's Eta Chapter of the Kappa Delta Rho fraternity, which chartered in 1921. The building has a French Eclectic design, a style popularized in America after World War I by returning soldiers and several photographic studies of French homes. The building's key French Eclectic features include a stucco exterior, a limestone entrance surround shaped like a basket handle, a stair tower, casement windows, and a hip roof with flared eaves.

The house was added to the National Register of Historic Places on May 21, 1990.

References

Residential buildings on the National Register of Historic Places in Illinois
Residential buildings completed in 1929
National Register of Historic Places in Champaign County, Illinois
Buildings and structures of the University of Illinois Urbana-Champaign
Fraternity and sorority houses
Buildings and structures in Champaign, Illinois